Syncarpha vestita is a species of flowering plant. It belongs to the genus Syncarpha, and family Asteraceae.

References

 Syncarpha vestita | PlantZAfrica

Gnaphalieae
Flora of South Africa